Ezekiel 13 is the thirteenth chapter of the Book of Ezekiel in the Hebrew Bible or the Old Testament of the Christian Bible. This book contains the prophecies attributed to the prophet/priest Ezekiel, and is one of the Books of the Prophets. This chapter contains rebukes against "a variety of false prophets", Ezekiel 13:1-16, and false prophetesses, Ezekiel 13:17-23.

Text
The original text of this chapter is written in the Hebrew language. This chapter is divided into 23 verses.

Textual witnesses
Some early manuscripts containing the text of this chapter in Hebrew are of the Masoretic Text tradition, which includes the Codex Cairensis (895), the Petersburg Codex of the Prophets (916), Aleppo Codex (10th century), Codex Leningradensis (1008).

There is also a translation into Koine Greek known as the Septuagint, made in the last few centuries BC. Extant ancient manuscripts of the Septuagint version include Codex Vaticanus (B; B; 4th century), Codex Alexandrinus (A; A; 5th century) and Codex Marchalianus (Q; Q; 6th century).

Verse 18
King James Version:
 And say, Thus saith the Lord God;
 Woe to the women that sew pillows to all armholes,
 and make kerchiefs upon the head of every stature to hunt souls!
 Will ye hunt the souls of my people,
 and will ye save the souls alive that come unto you?
 "Kerchief" (Hebrew: מספחות mispahot; Vulgate: cervicalia): a long veil for the head that hangs down covering the whole body (also in ).

Verse 19
 And will ye pollute me among my people for handfuls of barley and for pieces of bread,
 to slay the souls that should not die,
 and to save the souls alive that should not live,
 by your lying to my people that hear your lies?
 "For handfuls of barley and for pieces of bread": the bad actions were done "for a meager fee".

See also
Divination
Israel
Related Bible parts: Jeremiah 28, Jeremiah 29, 1 Corinthians 6, Ephesians 5

Notes

References

Bibliography

External links

Jewish
Ezekiel 13 Hebrew with Parallel English
Ezekiel 13 Hebrew with Rashi's Commentary

Christian
Ezekiel 13 English Translation with Parallel Latin Vulgate

13